Irina Olegovna Belova (born December 28, 1980, in Zavolzhye, Nizhny Novgorod Oblast) is a Russian rhythmic gymnast. She won a gold medal at the 2000 Summer Olympics.

References

External links
 
 
 

1980 births
Living people
People from Zavolzhye, Nizhny Novgorod Oblast
Russian rhythmic gymnasts
Olympic gymnasts of Russia
Olympic gold medalists for Russia
Gymnasts at the 2000 Summer Olympics
Olympic medalists in gymnastics
Medalists at the 2000 Summer Olympics
Fifth convocation members of the State Duma (Russian Federation)